Hidden Valley Lake may refer to:

 Hidden Valley Lake, California, a census-designated place in Lake County, California
 Hidden Valley Lake (California), a reservoir in Hidden Valley Lake, California
 A lake in Hidden Valley, Indiana
 A lake in the Hidden Valley Wildlife Management Area, Washington County, Virginia

See also
 Hidden Lake (disambiguation)
 Hidden Valley  (disambiguation)